Fanfonne Guillierme born Antoinette Guillierme (October 31, 1895, in Paris and died on January 22, 1989, in Aimargues) was a French manadière. She is known as "the Grande Dame of the Camargue".

References 

People of Camargue
1895 births
1989 deaths